Pablo Javier Robledo (born 23 July 1975) is a cross-country skier set to represent Argentina at the 2014 Winter Paralympics. He was chosen as Argentina's flag bearer for the opening ceremony of the 2014 Paralympic Winter Games in Sochi.

References

1975 births
Living people
Argentine male cross-country skiers
Cross-country skiers at the 2014 Winter Paralympics
Place of birth missing (living people)
21st-century Argentine people